Aliabad-e Chahdegan (also Romanized as ‘Alīābād-e Chāhdegān; also known as ‘Alīābād and ‘Alīābād-e Chāhdegāl) is a village in Chahdegal Rural District, Negin Kavir District, Fahraj County, Kerman Province, Iran. At the 2006 census, its population was 775, in 171 families.

References 

Populated places in Fahraj County